Barbara Ellen Handschu (born June 28, 1942) is an American political activist and lawyer, whose surname was memorialized on a set of federal guidelines "[ordering] restrictions on police surveillance ... signed by the city [of New York] in 1985", which became known as the Handschu decree.

Early life and education 
Handschu completed her undergraduate studies at New York University. She later earned her law degree at the University of Michigan Law School in 1963. She began her career as a law secretary to Justice Hilda Schwartz until her 1969 arrest at a squatters' demonstration in Manhattan caused her to switch careers to criminal defense lawyer.

Career
Handschu was an activist lawyer, representing, among others, the Young Lords of Spanish Harlem (to one of whom, Robert Lemus, she was briefly married), the Black Panthers, the Chicago Seven and participants in the Attica Prison riots.

She had been a resident of Buffalo, New York, and now is exclusively practicing matrimonial and custody law in New York City; she no longer practices criminal law. She was the first female president of the American Academy of Matrimonial Lawyers. As of 2016, she worked in New York as a divorce attorney.

Handschu has appeared in court multiple times regarding the original lawsuit filed against the New York Police Department in 1971 (over how the department spied on protestors during the Vietnam War era), including in 2013, when the department came under scrutiny for targeting Muslim communities following a rollback of the Handschu guidelines by a judge in 2003.

Personal life 
Handschu lives in Manhattan, returning to the city in 2013 after living in Buffalo for decades.

See also
 Police Surveillance of Political Activity -- The History and Current State of the Handschu Decree. Testimony of Arthur N. Eisenberg Presented to the New York Advisory Committee to the U.S. Commission on Civil Rights. New York Civil Liberties Union (May 21, 2003).

References

External links
 "Police Spied Broadly Before G.O.P. Convention", March 24, 2007 N.Y. Times article, about revelations of NYPD violations of the Handschu agreement leading up to and during the 2004 Republican Convention in New York City.

1942 births
Living people
American family lawyers
New York University alumni
University of Michigan Law School alumni
American women lawyers
Activists from New York (state)
21st-century American women